Noam Scheiber  is a writer for The New York Times and a former senior editor for The New Republic. He was with The New Republic from 2000 until 2014.

Scheiber is a Rhodes Scholar and a Truman Scholar. He holds a master's degree in economics from Oxford University and a bachelor's degree in mathematics and economics from Tulane University.

He has contributed to numerous other news sources including The Washington Post, CNN, CNBC and National Public Radio.

His book, The Escape Artists: How Obama's Team Fumbled the Recovery was released in February 2012. Based on more than 250 interviews combined with the author's own opinions it tells about the Obama administration's economic team and their handling of the economic recovery.

He shared the 2018 Gerald Loeb Award for Beat Reporting for the story "Automating Hate".

References

Year of birth missing (living people)
Living people
The New Republic people
American Rhodes Scholars
American Jews
American non-fiction writers
Gerald Loeb Award winners for Deadline and Beat Reporting